Pratiksha Apurv is an Indian painter, whose work is based on her uncle Bhagwan Shree Rajneesh (Osho)'s  teachings. Before moving to painting, she was a successful fashion designer. Apurv won the National Award 2015-16 given by the Lalit Kala Akademi, Ministry of Culture for her painting 'Cosmic Balance', and has exhibited her artwork across the country. Her artwork has featured in books and magazines, and in 2018 she wrote and illustrated her own book, The Mystic and Her Colours.

Early life
Pratiksha Apurv was born in Madhya Pradesh, India, the niece of Osho, founder of the Rajneesh movement. Her father Vijay Bharti is his younger brother. She took sannyas at the age of 11 and attended the Osho ashram in Pune. In 1982, she moved to Rajneeshpuram in the United States.

Career

In 1987 Apurv launched the Oshonik label, eventually designing clothes for Atal Bihari Vajpayee, Vinod Khanna, Amjad Ali Khan, Hansraj Hans, Kapil dev, Zakir Hussain and others.  She also writes a regular column in The Speaking Tree, a spiritual publication of The Times of India. In 2003 she retired from dress design and taught herself to paint.

Her first solo show was attended by former Prime Minister Atal Bihari Vajpayee. and the second series of Spiritual Odyssey exhibitions at NCPA Mumbai, was praised by critics.

In one of her exhibitions at lalit Kala Academy, New Delhi, Apurv launched her Upanishad Collection. Former national Security advisor Brajesh Mishra inaugurated the show.

In March 2010, her exhibition at L&P Hutheesing Visual art centre, was attended by Gujarat Chief Minister Narendra Modi. In 2010, her painting, 'Whirling' was used for the cover of the book Introducing New Age Islam, released during the UN Human rights meeting in Geneva.

Indian Council for Cultural Relations (ICCR) magazine "Indian Horizons" has featured Images of 34 paintings for their special issue (Oct–Dec, 2011) published in March 2012. The paintings are used as illustrations in the magazine for "Vedanta & Spirituality". 

Some of her paintings appeared in Vikram Chopra's book Shakespeare: The Indian Icon published in 2011. She was also a member of a jury for  'Swedish Innovations - Indian Interpretations' photo contest that was organised by Embassy of Sweden in 2012 at New Delhi. 

Apurv's paintings were selected for the 'Soul of Asia' section of the 44th International Film Festival of India IFFI held in November 2013 in Goa. The show  was inaugurated by  Manish Tewari and Susan Sarandon. The festival also screened the film Master of the Masters featuring 22 of her paintings. 

Her Mystical Moments series of paintings at the Rashtrapati Bhawan Museum was attended by President Pranab Mukherjee, Vice President Hamid Ansari and Prime Minister Narendra Modi on July 25, 2016.

A book The Mystic and Her Colours, a collection of her columns from The Speaking Tree illustrated by her paintings, was published in September 2018.

Meditative art

Her paintings include religious imagery, spiritual icons, and abstract symbols. Apurv has also contemporary figures silhouetted in black against a colourful background featuring people engaged in various forms of social interaction like dancing with one another or engrossed in quiet, intimate dialogue. Some of her paintings have strong overtones of Tibetan influences such as "Jalpari," which has a colourful mythological figure rising out of the water against an elaborately detailed sky. A figure prays behind a finely detailed fretwork screen in the painting 'Devotion' and a tranquil Buddha head with rays of light radiating around it appears in 'Illuminations'.

Themes
In the last fifteen years since the launch of her Solo Exhibition 'Spiritual Odyssey' Pratiksha has worked on various aspects of Meditative Art. Some of her themes include: Mindfulness, Seven Energy Centres, Seven Layers of Consciousness, Five Senses, Sixth Sense and Beyond Senses. She has also done a series on tantra, yoga, five elements and optical illusion. Although, volumes have been written on the subject of 'Life and Death', Pratiksha has tried to depict this important subject through Colours. Her paintings also reflect the messages of Gautam Buddha, Krishna, Meera, Kabir, Nanak, Shiva, Sufis, Jesus, Islam, Zen and the Upanishads.

Achievements

She won the National Award 2015-16 for her painting titled Cosmic Balance. Her work was also part of National Exhibition in Lucknow on March 10, 2016 that was inaugurated by Ram Naik, Governor of Uttar Pradesh. Her paintings were selected for India's national exhibition organised by Lalit Kala Akademi, New Delhi for the 52nd, 53rd and 54th National Exhibition.

Exhibition

1. Solo show – "Spiritual Odyssey" AIFACS Gallery New Delhi, Feb 2007.

2. Solo show – "Spiritual Odyssey" NCPA Gallery Mumbai, September 2007.

3. Solo show – "Spiritual Odyssey" Lalit Kala Akademi, March 2008.

4. Solo show – "Spiritual Odyssey" Chitrakala Parishath, Bangalore, December 2008.

5. Solo show – "Spiritual Odyssey" Lalit Kala Akademi, Chennai, January 2009.

6. Solo show – "Spiritual Odyssey" L&P Hutheesing Visual art centre, Ahmedabad, March 2010.

7. Solo show – "Spiritual Odyssey" Allure Art gallery, Vadodara, April 2010.

8. Solo show – "Reflections" Lalit Kala Akademi, New Delhi, November–December 2010.

9. Solo show – "Reflections" ICCR, New Delhi, July 2011.

10. Solo show – "Selected works of Pratiksha" Punjab Kala Bhawan, Chandigarh, April 2013.

11. Solo show – "Divine Art" INOX, IFFI Goa, November 2013

12. Solo show – "Mystical Moments" Rashtrapati Bhawan Museum, New Delhi, July 2016

13. Solo show – "Mystical Moments" Lalit Kala Akademi, New Delhi, March 2018

See also

Rajneesh movement

References

External links
Pratiksha Apurv Profile

Living people
1964 births
20th-century Indian painters
Indian women painters
Rajneesh movement
20th-century Indian women artists
Women artists from Madhya Pradesh
Painters from Madhya Pradesh
21st-century Indian women artists